is a Japanese film series starring Kiyoshi Atsumi as , a kind-hearted vagabond who is always unlucky in love. The series itself is often referred to as "Tora-san" by its fans.  Spanning 48 installments released between 1969 and 1995, all of the Otoko wa Tsurai yo films except episodes 3 (Azuma Morisaki) and 4 (Shun'ichi Kobayashi) were directed by Yōji Yamada, who also wrote (or co-wrote) all the screenplays.

Each film featured a different leading lady, called a Madonna, and a different region of Japan. (There were also episodes that featured scenes in Arizona and Vienna.) Two films were usually made each year between 1969 and 1989, one for summer and one for New Year release. From 1990 to 1995 only one film was made each year, for New Year release. AnimEigo released a box-set of the first four films in the United States in 2009 under the title "Tora-san". The series holds the Guinness World Record for the longest-running movie series starring a single actor.

The film series had presumed to have ended with Atsumi's declining health and death from lung cancer at age 68, without Tora-san ever settling down and finding domestic happiness. Atsumi was so identified with the Tora-san character that his death was also considered by fans to be the death of Tora-san. Director Yamada had decided at the time not to continue the series after Atsumi's death, but reworked a Tora-san script stuck in development as Niji wo Tsukamu Otoko starring Nishida Toshiyuki as a traveling cinema operator. Although Niji was a tribute to movies in general, the final scenes were Yamada's touching, loving posthumous tribute to the Tora-san series and to Atsumi Kiyoshi. Almost all of the principal actors from Otoko wa Tsurai yo have cameos in the Niji film, and the Tora-san character even makes a surprise cameo appearance near the end of the movie. The film ends with a dedication to Atsumi Kiyoshi.

However, the 50th Tora-san film, Tora-san, Wish You Were Here, was released in Japan on December 27, 2019. Atsumi appears throughout the film as flashbacks, using footage from his dozens of performances as Tora-san in the previous films, with the cast members in contemporary Tokyo recalling his presence in their lives.

Basic plot
Torajirō Kuruma (Tora-san) is a traveling salesman whose sole possessions are the contents of a small suitcase, the clothes on his back and some pocket money. He wanders from town to town peddling his wares. He yearns to return to his home in Shibamata, Katsushika, Tokyo.

His family members include Sakura (his kind-hearted half-sister), Hiroshi (Sakura's husband), Mitsuo (Sakura and Hiroshi's son), Tatsuzō (Tora-san's elderly uncle), and Tsune (Tora-san's elderly aunt). Tatsuzō and Tsune run a traditional sweet (dango) shop in Shibamata. The film often begins with Tora-san dreaming of doing grand deeds, anxious to be worthy of his family, usually resulting in disappointment and subsequent awakening.

Tora-san unexpectedly drops in on his family. While they are glad to see him, Tora-san's stay eventually causes some kind of ruckus and usually a violent family argument ensues. He then storms off with his belongings just as suddenly as he arrived.

In each film he falls in love with a "Madonna", an attractive woman, but he invariably ends up heartbroken.

Origin of the series
Preceding the first theatrical film of Otoko wa Tsurai yo, a teledrama version was broadcast from 1968 to 1969. It was originally titled "Gukei (or "Gukyō")-Kenmai" (愚兄賢妹), meaning "Goofy Brother and Wise Sister." The name comes from the final subtitle of Naite tamaruka (泣いてたまるか). (The star of Naite tamaruka is also Atsumi Kiyoshi.)

Kobayashi Shun'ichi renamed the show Otoko wa Tsurai yo. In the final episode of the TV series, Torajirō dies of a snakebite. This denouement made the audience angry and a film version of Otoko wa Tsurai yo followed.

Initially, Shochiku, the distributing agency, was not enthusiastic about the film's prospects but Yōji Yamada's persuasiveness ultimately prevailed. The film series went on to become a huge success with films released every summer and New Years. The series became part of Japanese pop culture. With the exception of Morikawa Shin, the supporting cast of the television version did not reprise their roles in the film series – though Sato Gajiro appears in most of the films as "Gen-chan", Nagayama Aiko is the Madonna in the 6th film and Hisashi Igawa is her suitor.

Cast

TV series
Kiyoshi Atsumi as Torajirō Kuruma
Chieko Baisho as Sakura
Shin Morikawa as Tatsuzō Kuruma
Tokuko Sugiyama as Tsune Kuruma
Gajirō Satō as Yūjirō (Torajiro's little brother)
Hisashi Igawa as Hiroshi Suwa (a doctor)
kikirin

Films
Kiyoshi Atsumi as Torajirō Kuruma
Chieko Baisho as Sakura Suwa
Gin Maeda as Hiroshi Suwa
Shin Morikawa – as Tatsuzō Kuruma (in films 1 to 8)
Tatsuo Matsumura – as Tatsuzō Kuruma (in films 9 to 13)
Masami Shimojō as Tatsuzō Kuruma (in films 14 to 48)
Chieko Misaki as Tsune Kuruma
Hidetaka Yoshioka as Mitsuo Suwa
Hisao Dazai as Boss (Umetarō Katsura)
Chishū Ryū as Gozen-sama
Gajirō Satō as Genkō

Anime
Kōichi Yamadera as Torajirō Kuruma
Yumi Tōma as Lilly
Mari Okamoto as Sakura Suwa
Hōchū Ōtsuka as Hiroshi Suwa
Minori Yada as Tatsuzō Kuruma
Mie Azuma as Tsune Kuruma
Mine Eken as Umetarō Katsura
Ryūji Saikachi as Gozen-sama
Naoki Tatsuta as Genkō

Film series

Madonnas
Each movie had a female guest star with whom Tora-san would usually fall head over heels (or, in the later movies, play a surrogate father figure). These characters were referred to as "Madonnas". Each Madonna was played by an ingenue who was popular at the time of the movie's release.

References

General

Specific

Further reading 
 "Tora-san" in Schilling, Mark. The Encyclopedia of Japanese Pop Culture. New York: Weatherhill, 1997, pp. 268–272. .

Films directed by Yoji Yamada
Japanese-language films
Shochiku films
Japanese film series